John B. Harrison (1861 – 1947) was a justice of the Oklahoma Supreme Court from 1927 to 1929.

Early life
Born in Anderson County, Kentucky on 10 April 1861, he was the son of William Garrett Harrison and his wife, Mary Lucretia (Buntin) Harrison. He attended the common schools of Anderson County, but moved to Texas, where he went to high schools in Gainesville and Whitesboro, and an academy at Paris, Texas. After finishing his schooling, John went to West Texas to work on cattle ranches and later to teach school, until he was admitted to the bar in Greer County, Texas.  As a licensed attorney, he became County Judge in Wheeler, Texas.

Career in law
In 1891, Harrison moved to that part of Greer County that the U. S. Supreme Court would award to Oklahoma. In 1894, Harrison moved to the newly created Roger Mills County, Oklahoma,  where he became County Attorney from 1894 to 1898.

In 1911, he was appointed as a judge on the Supreme Court Commission. He resigned in 1914, to accept an appointment as an Assistant Attorney General of Oklahoma, serving under Attorney General S. P. Freeling. His term expired on February 1, 1915,

The Harrisons continued to live in Oklahoma City after his resignation from the Supreme Court in 1928. He practiced law privately until his death in 1947.

Personal
John B. Harrison married Henrietta (nee) Wallach on April 30, 1891, at Mangum, Oklahoma Territory. They had six children, four sons and two daughters.

He had belonged to the following organizations:
 Christian Church; Memberships
 Oklahoma Bar Association
 Democratic party
 Oklahoma Hall of Fame

See also
Reading the law

Notes

References

Justices of the Oklahoma Supreme Court
1861 births
1947 deaths
People from Anderson County, Kentucky
People from Greer County, Oklahoma
People from Wheeler, Texas
U.S. state supreme court judges admitted to the practice of law by reading law